Chup Raho is a Pakistani drama series that aired on ARY Digital from 19 August 2014. It is directed by Yasir Nawaz. It is written by Samira Fazal and produced by Six Sigma Entertainment. It stars Sajal Ali, Syed Jibran, Yasir Nawaz, Arjumand Rahim and Feroze Khan.

Plot
The story revolves around Rameen, who comes from Islamabad to Karachi along with her parents to meet her sister Minal and brother-in-law Numair who is shown to have lustful eyes upon her. He rapes her and forcefully makes her remain silent. Azar, who is a cousin of Numair,  is keen to marry her, but after being raped by Numair she is reluctant thinking that he might be the same as Numair. Rameen discloses to her parents that she is being harassed by Numair to which her mother asks her to keep it as a secret as it could affect her sister's marital life. Numair attacks his father-in-law as he discovers the truth. Rameen's father suffers from a heart attack and passes away. Rameen then agrees to marry Azar after which she tries to tell her husband the truth about Numair but he, along with everyone else, thinks that she is lying as Rameen's mother lies to everyone that Rameen is suffering from a disease and needs medical attention as she wanted to save her daughter Minal's house. Later, her mother dies and Azar, Minal and Numair throw her out of the house and she is made to live in the servant quarters. No one believes her to be innocent. Rameen then leaves the house quietly. She lives in a private women's hostel, where she meets a girl who sells girls for money. Rameen doesn't know about it but when she gets to know about it, she gets out of the car in which that girl was going to sell her. There, she meets Sheraz. Sheraz's is a widower with three daughters. On the other side, Azar  in a drunk state commits suicide as he has a guilt of what he did with Rameen. Sheraz takes Rameen to his house. There, she gets attached with his daughters and  mother and asks Sheraz to live in his house as a maid. He gives her permission to live in his house but soon both of them fall in love with each other. On the other hand, Numair and Minal's daughter suffers from cancer. Numair thinks that if Rameen lives close to his daughter than she will be cured and Allah will forgive his sins. When Rameen comes back to home, Numair accepts that he raped Rameen and to stop her from going away again, he doesn't tell her that Azar is dead (he was guilty and committed suicide) . He says that Azar is in Saudi Arabia and sends her flowers and messages on the name of azar to make sure she thinks that he is alive. Minal is confused and agitated so she confronts Rameen to tell her that Azar is dead and that Numair is lying to her. Numair claims Sheraz to have lustful eyes towards Rameen to the fact which Rameen blindly accepts. But when Rameen learns the truth, she leaves the house and marries Sheraz. Numair is devastated and thinks that now his daughter is going to die and eventually he turns mad and is admitted in mental hospital. Minal is in the hospital crying over her daughters condition while she remembers all those times when she wronged her own sister just for her husband. While Sheraz and Rameen live with their children happily.

Cast
 Sajal Ali as Rameen
 Yasir Nawaz as Sheraz
 Syed Jibran as Numair
 Arjumand Rahim as Minal
 Feroze Khan as Aazer
 Shaheen Khan as Rameen and Minal's mother
 Tariq Jameel as Rameen and Minal's father
 Rizwana as Sheraz's mother
 Silah (childstar)
 Eshal (childstar)
 Arisha (childstar)

Release
In 2015, the show was broadcast in India on Zindagi under the title Khamosh Ladki ... Dheere Dheere Fanah In 2017, it was also aired on ARY Digital's sister channel ARY Zindagi. Furthermore, it is also available on Indian OTT platform MX Player to stream online.

Reception
The drama serial soon became popular after its release. It made the ARY Digital slot leader on Tuesdays. The drama serial gained high ratings and was commercial success and received average TRPs of 6.5 and of 8.9 at its highest. Initially, the show was also praised by the critics due to its unique storyline and portrayal of a taboo subject, but later it was criticised due to its unauthentic, flawed dramatisation and misleading depiction.

Accolades

Nominations
 Lux Style Awards - Bes TV Play
 Lux Style Awards - Best TV Writer - Samira Fazal
 Lux Style Awards - Best TV Actor - Syed Jibran

References

External links 
 Official website
 Chup Raho on MX Player

Pakistani drama television series
Samira Fazal
Television series written by Samira Fazal
ARY Digital original programming
Urdu-language telenovelas
2014 Pakistani television series debuts
2015 Pakistani television series endings